Plaridel station is a railway station located on the South Main Line in Quezon, Philippines. It is still in use for the Bicol Express and Isarog Limited. It is located adjacent to the Siain Port and the Pan-Philippine Highway. It was opened on May 10, 1916 as Siain, then located in Atimonan until the creation of Plaridel in 1962.

References

Philippine National Railways stations
Railway stations in Quezon